Arles Rhône 3 is an ancient Roman boat discovered in 2004, with parts of it only  below the surface in the Rhône River of Arles, France. It has been displayed since 2013 at the Musée départemental Arles antique. A marble Neptune was also discovered in the river, and divers recovered many amphorae. The boat’s flat bottom was made of oak planks.

See also 

 Alkedo
 Marsala Ship
 Roman ship of Marausa

References

Further reading

2004 archaeological discoveries
2004 in France
Roman Arles
Romano-French objects in Musée départemental Arles antique
Shipwrecks
Archaeology of France
1st century in Roman Gaul
Archaeology of Provence-Alpes-Côte d'Azur